The Shadow of What Was Lost is a 2014 Australian high fantasy novel, the debut novel by James Islington. It is the first book in The Licanius Trilogy, followed by An Echo of Things to Come and The Light of All That Falls. In a world formerly ruled by Augurs who could see the future, the use of Essence to complete magical tasks is highly restricted. When an ancient barrier protecting the world from demons begins to fail, young Augur Davian must embrace his powers.

Premise

Until twenty years ago, Andarra was ruled by the Augurs, who had various powers including precognition and time manipulation. They were assisted by the Gifted, who could use their life energy, or Essence, to perform various magical tasks. Unlike Gifted, Augurs could not only draw Essence from an inner Reserve, but could also manipulate Essence from another sources by using a less understood power. Somehow, the Augurs’ abilities became corrupted and their visions became less accurate. In their struggle to keep power, a civil war broke out. Royalists led by King Kevran Andras were victorious. All known Augurs were killed and new Augurs were quickly executed, and only two Gifted schools (Tol Athien and Tol Shen) survived. The Four Tenets were instituted by the Andras family. The Tenets are a magical contract which limit the abilities of the Gifted; they must obey orders from Administrators and may not use Essence to harm others.

Plot

Davian is a young man studying at Caladel, a school under the supervision of the Tol Athian council. Davian learns that he is actually an Augur. He is given a Vessel, an Augur artifact, and is told that the Boundary, an ancient border north of Andarra, is failing. Behind it lie monsters led by immortal Augur Aarkein Devaed. Devaed is planning an invasion of Andarra. Davian and his best friend Wirr escape. That night, almost every remaining resident is murdered. The only survivor is their friend Asha, another young Gifted. Asha becomes Tol Athian's Representative to the Northwarden Elocian Andras, brother of the king and leader of the Administrators. Elocian tells Asha that he is secretly rescuing Augurs and regrets the creation of the Tenets.

Davian's Vessel, the Portal Box, leads them to rescue a Gifted man named Caeden. Caeden has been accused of massacring an entire village, but has lost his memories. Davian is transported to the past. He meets a shapeshifting Augur named Malshash, who trains Davian to use Augur abilities before sending him back to his own time.

The Northwarden's Augurs have a vision of Ilin Illan, the capital city, being overrun by invaders known as the Blind. Asha, Davian, and Wirr (who is actually Elocian's son) reunite in the city. Davian discovers that Devaed's master plan involves restoring Caeden's memories. Elocian is killed by the blind; Wirr then changes the Tenets to allow the Gifted to fight.

Caeden meets a man named Garadis, guardian of the sword Licanius. The sword may only be given to one who is not seeking it. Caeden, in his past lives has been trying to take the sword for centuries; he eventually erased his own memories and planned a pathway to lead him to Licanius. Caeden uses Licanius to kill the entire army of the Blind. Davian leaves Ilin Illan to join Tol Shen, where he will work with other Augurs to repair the Boundary. Caeden uses the Portal Stone to meet a man who can restore his memories. He requests to see the memory of the day he was accused of the village massacre, believing it will prove his innocence. He learns that he is guilty, and also that he is both Malshash and Aarkein Devaed. Caeden collapses in grief.

Background
James Islington wrote the initial draft for The Shadow of What Was Lost over the course of "a couple of years". He received multiple rejections and decided to self-publish the novel. Within a year of self-publishing, Islington signed a deal with Orbit Books to publish a physical copy.

Reception
The novel received moderately positive reviews. Publishers Weekly praised the novel's complex magic, political intrigue, and large cast of characters. A reviewer for Tor.com enjoyed the worldbuilding but criticized the lack of narrative tension, stating that the novel "offers a great deal of promise" but "is ultimately very uneven". Kirkus Reviews stated that although the premise was unoriginal, the books was a "promising page-turner from a poised newcomer". A reviewer for The Guardian called the novel an example of the "inherently derivative" subgenre of epic fantasy; despite this, the review praised Islington's "story-telling assurance [that is] rare for a debut novelist".

References

2014 Australian novels
Fiction about amnesia
High fantasy novels
Novels about time travel
Self-published books
2014 debut novels
Orbit Books books